Sir Alexander Hood, 2nd Baronet (5 July 1793 – 7 March 1851), was an English Conservative Party politician.

He was a Member of Parliament (MP) for Somerset West from 1847 until his death in 1851.

References

1793 births
1851 deaths
Baronets in the Baronetage of the United Kingdom
UK MPs 1847–1852
Conservative Party (UK) MPs for English constituencies
Alexander